Gudyri is a rural locality (a village) in Vereshchaginsky District, Perm Krai, Russia. The population was 138 as of 2010. There are 4 streets.

Geography 
Gudyri is located 8 km southeast of Vereshchagino (the district's administrative centre) by road. Oshchepkovo is the nearest rural locality.

References 

Rural localities in Vereshchaginsky District